Verkhovsky Pogost is a rural locality (a selo) in Verkhovskoye Rural Settlement, Tarnogsky District, Vologda Oblast, Russia. The population was 57 as of 2002.

Geography 
Verkhovsky Pogost is located 40 km west of Tarnogsky Gorodok (the district's administrative centre) by road. Makarovskaya is the nearest rural locality.

References 

Rural localities in Tarnogsky District